Dive bomb, dive-bomb or divebomb may refer to:
 Dive bomb (guitar technique)
 Divebomb, a Transformers character
 Dive bomber, bomber aircraft that dives towards its target
 Cannonball (diving)

See also
Dive bomber (disambiguation)
Aerial bomb